The Men's 20 kilometre individual biathlon competition at the 2002 Winter Olympics was held on 11 February, at Soldier Hollow. Competitors raced over five loops of a 4.0 kilometre skiing course, shooting four times, twice prone and twice standing. Each miss resulted in one minute being added to a competitor's skiing time.

Results 

Raphaël Poirée was defending overall World Cup champion, while Sergei Rozhkov was the defending World Cup champion in the individual race. Paavo Puurunen had won the most recent world championships, and Halvard Hanevold had won the 1998 Olympic title. Ole Einar Bjørndalen, who had finished just behind Poirée in the overall world cup, had dominated the test event in 2001, winning all three races, including the individual, beating Sven Fischer.
Frank Luck led the World Cup in the Individual entering the Games,  having won one of the warmup events, with Pavel Rostovtsev and Daniel Mesotitsch winning the others.

Bjørndalen, having just placed 5th in the 30 kilometre cross-country race, was the earliest of the favourites to start. He missed once on both his second and third shoots, but still had the fastest time, just ahead of Viktor Maigourov, who had missed only once. Neither would miss on the last shoot, but over the final two loops, Bjørndalen would gain more than 30 seconds on the Russian, easily taking the early lead. Poirée was ahead of Bjørndalen with only a single miss on the first three shots, but faded after missing a shot on the last set, ending up 10th. Rozkhov shot clear, but struggled with his skiing, unable to get anywhere near the leaders with his pace on the snow, and ending up 12th.

Just behind him, Ricco Groß was level with Bjørndalen early, and while he did record one of the faster ski times, his two misses meant he finished nearly a minute behind, in third for the time being. Like Rozkhov, Frank Luck also shot clear, and after Bjørndalen's second miss, he was ahead of the Norwegian by 23 seconds. He couldn't match the Norwegian's ski time over the final section, though, ending up just ahead of Maigurov in silver medal position. Hanevold was another who shot clear, but ended up 5th. Frode Andresen, the last starter, and the closest to matching Bjørndalen in ski pace, was ahead of his countryman by 90 seconds after the third shoot, having been clear to that point, but then missed three on the final shoot, sending him all the way down to 7th and securing Bjørndalen's victory. "It was worse to stand here watching Frode shoot than shoot myself," Bjørndalen said.

The race was started at 13:30.

References

Men's biathlon at the 2002 Winter Olympics